was an admiral in the Imperial Japanese Navy who served in World War II. He was killed in action during the Battle of Kwajalein.

Biography 
Akiyama was born to a farm family in what is now part of the city of Kan'onji, Kagawa, Japan. The family was very poor, and could not afford any machinery, so as a youth, Akiyama spent his school holidays in the fields. In 1911 he was accepted into the 42nd class of the Imperial Japanese Naval Academy, and graduated in December 1914 ranked 66 out of 114 cadets. He was assigned as a second lieutenant on the battleship . In 1937, he was promoted to captain, and received his first command, that of the supply ship . He returned to shore duty to command the guard division at Kure Naval District. He was promoted to rear admiral in May 1943 and made commander of the Kure Naval Arsenal.

However, later in 1943, he was assigned command of the 6th Naval Base Force and ordered to Kwajalein, in the Marshall Islands, replacing Vice Admiral Koso Abe. American forces had recently taken the Gilbert Islands, including Makin Island and Tarawa. Akiyama was in command of 5000 troops on the main islet of Kwajalein itself, with another 3000 troops on the islet of Roi-Namur on the opposite end of the same atoll. However, most of these troops were poorly-trained reservists with no combat experience.  Akiyama arrived in November 1943 and immediately ordered the construction of fortifications; however, the topography of the small islands made defence in depth impossible and there was no time or materials to construct anything substantial, such as the concrete bunkers which had served the Japanese defenders so well on Tarawa. Akiyama was also aware that there were no plans to send reinforcements, supplies or to plan for an evacuation, as the island had already been declared outside Japan's "absolute defence zone" by Imperial General Headquarters. On the first day of the American landings, he left his bunker to observe the front line, and was killed in action. He was posthumously promoted to vice admiral on March 29. In 1962, he posthumously received the Order of the Rising Sun, 2nd class.

References 
 Bernard Millot: The Pacific War. BUR, Montreuil, 1967
 Donald M. Goldstein and Katherine V. Dillon: Fading Victory: The Diary of Admiral Matome Ugaki, 1941-45. University of Pittsburgh Press, 1992,

Notes

1891 births
1944 deaths
People from Kagawa Prefecture
Japanese military personnel killed in World War II
Japanese admirals of World War II
Recipients of the Order of the Rising Sun